Cyanide in the Beefcake, the third studio album by Johannes Kerkorrel, was released in early 1994. After Kerkorrel's death in 2002 the lyrics to the title track were said to have been a possible prediction of his suicide.

Track listing
 Daar is Geen
 Absoluut Goed
 Speel My Pop
 Dirty Business
 Elektriese Stoel
 Te Veel vir 'n Witvrou in Afrika
 Awuwa (Dansen)
 River of Love
 Mozambique
 Alles Beter Binne die Droom
 Waiting for Godot

Personnel
 Ian Herman
 Andre Abrahamse
 Rudi Genbrugge
 Didi Kriel
 Mauritz Lotz
 James Phillips
 Coleski Broers
 Wendy Oldfield
 Lydia Von Hagen
 Victor Masondo
 Lloyd Marti

Awards
1995 SAMA – Best Pop Music Performance

References

1994 albums
Johannes Kerkorrel albums